The Palawan flowerpecker (Prionochilus plateni) is a species of bird in the family Dicaeidae. It is endemic to the Philippines.

Its natural habitat is subtropical or tropical moist lowland forest.

The scientific name commemorates the German zoologist Carl Constantin Platen.

References

Palawan flowerpecker
Birds of Palawan
Palawan flowerpecker
Palawan flowerpecker
Taxonomy articles created by Polbot